Boys and Girls High School, the oldest public high school in Brooklyn, is a comprehensive high school in Bedford–Stuyvesant, Brooklyn, New York, United States. The school is located at 1700 Fulton Street.

As of the 2014–15 school year, the school had an enrollment of 643 students and 43.0 classroom teachers (on an FTE basis), for a student–teacher ratio of 15.0:1. There were 463 students (72.0% of enrollment) eligible for free lunch and 15 (2.3% of students) eligible for reduced-cost lunch.

History
Brooklyn's first public high school, the Central Grammar School (named "Central" rather than "Free" to avoid controversy over providing free "higher education" for poor children), opened, September 1878 in a rented building on Court & Livingston Streets. A new building was planned on the east side of Nostrand Avenue between from Halsey and Macon Streets, designed by Superintendent of Buildings James W. Naughton, but by the time it opened in 1886, enrollment had increased to the point where it was decided to use this building as the girls' high school and to build a separate building for the boys.  The boys remained in the Court Street space.  As there were now effectively two schools, in 1891 they were renamed as the Girls' High School and the Boys' High School. A new building for the boys was begun in 1891, on Marcy Avenue, between Madison Street & Putnam Avenue.  it opened as Boys High School on November 1, 1892.  In 1975 the two schools were merged once again, and shortly afterwards moved into their present building at Fulton Street and Utica Avenue.

From 1986 until 2004, the school's principal was Frank Mickens, who dealt with the school's many problems during the 1980s, and turned into an excellent college preparatory institution for poor and marginalized young men and women. By 1989 some 70 percent of graduates were enrolled in colleges. Though Mickens methods were attacked on the grounds that he was steering undesirable students to other institutions, his success was hard to question; and there had been no objections during the long years in which both Boys' and Girls' had been in decline, largely due to "steering" good students to other places.

Mission Statement

The mission statement for Boys and Girls High school is, ''"The mission of Boys and Girls High School is to prepare our students to achieve their full potential, make positive choices, and have a plan for life after high school. This will be accomplished by creating an environment that will successfully teach our students to think critically and conscientiously about themselves, their community, and their global village."

Noted alumni

Isaac Asimov (Isaak Yudovich Ozimov), writer
Jules Bender, basketball player
Albert Blaustein (1921–1994), civil rights and human rights lawyer and constitutional consultant who helped draft the Fijian and Liberian constitutions.
Emanuel Celler, Congressman
Shirley Chisholm, Congresswoman, presidential candidate
Ray Copeland, jazz trumpeter
Aaron Copland, composer
Tommy Davis, baseball and basketball player
Norma Donaldson, actress, singer.
Ronnie Dyson, singer
Connie Hawkins, basketball player
Rita Hayworth, actress 
Lena Horne, singer, actress
Edward Everett Horton, actor and comedian
Duke Jordan, jazz pianist
Alan King, actor and comedian
Morris Lapidus, architect
Norman Mailer, author
Mickey Marcus, attorney and soldier
Sean Michaels, adult film actor and director
Jean Nidetch, businesswoman
Cecil Payne, jazz saxophonist
Man Ray, avant-garde artist, photographer
Dwayne "Pearl" Washington, basketball player
Randy Weston, jazz pianist
Irving Thalberg, movie producer
John C. Whitehead, Artist / politician
Lenny Wilkens, basketball player
Dom Zanni, baseball player
Hugh Evans, Referee NBA

References

External links
 Original building site construction
 Profile in New York Times
 Football 1997 Championship
 Boys & Girls headman Frank Mickens calls it quits after 18 years at school

Public high schools in Brooklyn
Bedford–Stuyvesant, Brooklyn